Apolinère Enameled was painted in 1916–17 by Marcel Duchamp, as a heavily altered version of an advertisement for paint ("Sapolin Enamel"). The picture depicts a girl painting a bed-frame with white enamelled paint. The depiction of the frame deliberately includes conflicting perspective lines, to produce an impossible object. To emphasise the deliberate impossibility of the shape, a piece of the frame is missing. The piece is sometimes referred to as Duchamp's "impossible bed" painting.

Apolinère is a play-on-words referencing the poet, writer and art critic Guillaume Apollinaire, a close associate of Duchamp during the Cubist adventure. Apollinaire wrote about Duchamp (and others) in his book The Cubist Painters, Aesthetic Meditations of 1913.

See also
Readymades of Marcel Duchamp

References

External links
Philadelphia Museum of Art

Impossible objects
1916 paintings
Marcel Duchamp works
Paintings of children
Guillaume Apollinaire